Diogma is a genus of crane flies in the family Cylindrotomidae.

Biology
The larvae of the genus Diogma live on mosses. Adults are to be found in damp wooded habitats.

Distribution
Palaearctic.

Species
D. brevifurca Alexander, 1949
D. caudata Takahashi, 1960
D. dmitrii Paramonov, 2005
D. glabrata (Meigen, 1818)
D. minuticornis (Alexander, 1935)
D. sinensis Yang & Yang, 1995

References

Cylindrotomidae
Tipulomorpha genera